Kata Tjuṯa (Pitjantjatjara: , lit. The park is considered sacred to the Aboriginal people of Australia.

Kata Tjuṯa is located at the eastern end of the Docker River Road.

Name
The other name, The Olgas, comes from the tallest peak, Mount Olga. At the behest of Baron Ferdinand von Mueller, Mount Olga was named in 1872 by Ernest Giles, in honour of Queen Olga of Württemberg (born Grand Duchess Olga of Russia, daughter of Tsar Nicholas I). She and her husband, King Charles I of Württemberg, had marked their 25th wedding anniversary the previous year by, among other things, naming Mueller a Freiherr (baron), making him Ferdinand von Mueller. The naming was his way of repaying the compliment.

On 15 December 1993, a dual naming policy was adopted that allowed official names consisting of both the traditional Aboriginal name and the English name. As a result, Mount Olga was renamed Mount Olga / Kata Tjuṯa. On 6 November 2002, following a request from the Regional Tourism Association, the order of the dual names was officially reversed, to Kata Tjuṯa / Mount Olga.

Geologic origin 

The region surrounding Kata Tjuṯa lies in the Amadeus Basin, an intracratonic basin formed during the Adelaidian, roughly 850–800  million years ago. During the Petermann Orogeny, approximately 550 million years ago, an event known as the Woodroffe Thrust lifted granulite facies rocks northward over low-grade metamorphic rocks. The eventual erosion of the formation resulted in a molasse facies, or deposition in front of rising mountains, in this case, the Petermann Orogeny, creating the deposit known as the Mount Currie Conglomerate. The Mount Currie Conglomerate is made predominantly of basalt, porphyry, granite, gneiss and volcanic rock fragments with a matrix composed of angular quartz, microcline and orthoclase among other minerals. 

Both Uluṟu / Ayers Rock and the Kata Tjuṯa / Mount Olga are made of sediment originating in this Mount Currie Conglomerate and both have a chemical composition similar to granite. Scientists using Rubidium-strontium dating techniques to date the rock accurately have given it an age of 600 million years, matching the date of the Woodroffe Thrust event. The actual fresh rock that makes up the Kata Tjuṯa / Olgas and Uluṟu / Ayers Rock is medium to dark grey with green or pink hues in some laminae. The bright orange-red hue, for which the structures are noted, is due to a patina over finely divided feldspar coated in iron oxide.

Legends
There are many Pitjantjatjara Dreamtime legends associated with this place and indeed everything in the vicinity including Uluṟu / Ayers Rock. A number of legends surround the great snake king Wanambi, who is said to live on the summit of Kata Tjuṯa / Mount Olga and only comes down during the dry season. His breath was said to be able to transform a breeze into a hurricane in order to punish those who did evil deeds. The majority of mythology surrounding the site is not disclosed to outsiders, and in particular, women. As is the custom, should women become privy to the "men's business", they are susceptible to violent attacks, even death. The Anangu people believe the great rocks of Kata Tjuṯa / Mount Olga are homes to spirit energy from the 'Dreaming', and since 1995 the site is being used once again for cultural ceremonies.

Locations, access and facilities
Kata Tjuṯa / Mount Olga can be reached via Ayers Rock Airport, followed by a  drive south, then west. Visitors are required to pay an entry fee. It is a  hour drive.

Kata Tjuṯa / Mount Olga has both a sunrise and sunset viewing area, which are accessible via a short walk from Kata Tjuṯa Road. There are also two walks that enter the domes of Kata Tjuta:

 Valley of the Winds - 7.4km  / 3-4 hours (Grade 4)
 Walpa Gorge walk - 2.6km  / 1-2 hours

Gallery

See also
 Ernest Giles
 Protected areas of the Northern Territory
 Recognition of sacred sites
 Tietkens expedition of 1889

References

External links 

 Uluṟu-Kata Tjuṯa National Park - Australian Department of the Environment and Water Resources
 A Report on the Uluṟu-Kata Tjuṯa National Park
 Uluṟu-Kata Tjuṯa park on Parks Australia (Australian Government)

Landforms of the Northern Territory
Inselbergs of Australia
Rock formations of the Northern Territory
Bornhardts
World Heritage Sites in the Northern Territory